Henry Frederick Carteret, 1st Baron Carteret PC (1735–1826), of Haynes, Bedfordshire (known until 1776 as the Honourable Henry Frederick Thynne), was Member of Parliament for Staffordshire (1757–1761), for Weobley in Herefordshire (1761–1770) and was Master of the Household to King George III 1768–1771. He was hereditary Bailiff of Jersey 1776–1826.

Origins
He was the second son of Thomas Thynne, 2nd Viscount Weymouth (1710–1751), by his second wife Louisa Carteret, daughter of John Carteret, 2nd Baron Carteret, 2nd Earl Granville (1690–1763).  He was thus the younger brother of Thomas Thynne, 3rd Viscount Weymouth, later created Marquess of Bath.

Education
He was educated at St John's College, Cambridge, graduating BA, and in 1753 proceeded MA. In 1769 he was awarded the degree of Doctor of Civil Laws.

Career
In 1757 he was encouraged by his friend and 3rd cousin (both were descended from daughters and eventual co-heiresses of John Granville, 1st Earl of Bath (1628–1701)) Granville Leveson-Gower, 2nd Earl Gower (1721–1803), to enter Parliament for Staffordshire, when that seat had become vacant following the death of Gower's uncle, Hon. William Leveson-Gower (died 1756).  In 1761 he was elected for the Herefordshire borough of Weobley, which he represented until 1770.

In 1762 his brother sought an office for him, leading to his appointment as Clerk Comptroller of the Green Cloth (worth £1000 per year). He lost this office when the Grenville government fell in 1765, and entered into opposition.  After his brother returned to office as Secretary of State in 1767, Thynne returned to the Royal household as Master of the Household, a post worth over £900 which he held until 1771.

He was made a member of the Privy Council in 1770.  In 1771 (after his brother had left office), he was given the office of joint Postmaster General, which he held until 1789.  This was worth £3000 per year, and he thereupon retired from the House of Commons. He gave up the postmastership in 1789, when his brother was created Marquess of Bath.

Inheritance and peerage
In 1776, by Act of Parliament, he changed his name and arms to Carteret, in compliance with his inheritance from his childless uncle Robert Carteret, 3rd Baron Carteret, 3rd Earl Granville (1721–1776) (under the terms of the will of the latter's father John Carteret, 2nd Earl Granville (1690–1763)), of his estates including Hawnes Park (now Haynes Park), in Bedfordshire and Kilkhampton in Cornwall (the ancient seat of the Granvilles, Earls of Bath). He also succeeded him as Bailiff of Jersey, a post (for life) long held by heads of the Carteret family.  In 1784 he was created Baron Carteret, of Hawnes, thus reviving his uncle's second title.

Rebuilds Hawnes Park

Hawnes Park was modernised and partly rebuilt by Henry Carteret, 1st Baron Carteret, and in 1813 consisted of two quadrangles. He rebuilt the south front in about 1785–1790, probably to the designs of James Lewis. In 1813 Lysons reported that it contained portraits of Margaret, Countess of Lennox; the mother of Rembrandt; Sir George and Lady Carteret; John, Earl Granville, and at the foot of the staircase "an ancient view" of Longleat, seat of the Thynne family.

Marriage
In 1810 he married his mistress of many years, Eleanor Smart, but there were no children.

Death and succession
He died in 1826 and was succeeded as 2nd Baron by his younger nephew Lord George Thynne (1770–1838) in accordance with a special remainder in the patent when he was created baron. His simple white marble mural monument with bust survives in Kilkhampton Church, Cornwall, inscribed: 
"Henry Frederick Thynne. Born November 1735. Privy Counsellor, Bailiff of Jersey, Baron Carteret of Hawnes. Died June 1826"

References

1735 births
1826 deaths
Alumni of St John's College, Cambridge
Thynne, Henry
Thynne, Henry
Thynne, Henry
Thynne, Henry
Members of the Privy Council of Great Britain
Thynne, Henry
United Kingdom Postmasters General
Bailiffs of Jersey
Younger sons of viscounts
Jersey law
1
Henry
Peers of Great Britain created by George III